Nirnaayakam is a 2015 Indian Malayalam-language drama film written by Bobby–Sanjay and directed by V. K. Prakash. The film features Asif Ali and Prem Prakash in Lead roles and Nedumudi Venu, Malavika Mohanan and Tisca Chopra in supporting roles. It was produced jointly by Jose Simon and Rajesh George Under the banner Jairaj Films. The film was released on 5 June 2015.

Plot 
Ajay is a student at National Defense Academy, Pune. Once he visited Kochi upon request from his ailing father, a leading advocate. There, he gradually gets involved with a case. Ajay starts taking steps to help his father win the case involving a death, alleged to have taken place due to a government party's negligence. The film highlights the need for the government to change their attitude concerning human rights.

Cast

Release 
The film started production in December 2014 and released on 6 June 2015 in 58 screens across Kerala.

Awards 

 National Film Awards
Best Film on Other Social Issues

 Kerala State Film Awards
Best Character Actor – Prem Prakash

 Kerala Film Critics Association Awards
Best Actor (Special Jury) - Asif Ali

References

External links 
 

2015 films
2010s Malayalam-language films
Indian drama films
Films shot in Maharashtra
Films shot in Kochi
Best Film on Other Social Issues National Film Award winners
Films directed by V. K. Prakash
Films scored by M. Jayachandran